Ulla Ulla Airport  is an extremely-high elevation airport  north of Ulla Ulla village in the La Paz Department of Bolivia. Ulla Ulla is close to the Peruvian border north of Lake Titicaca.

While the entire region is mountainous, the airport is on an alluvial fan of the Cordillera Apolobamba mountains, with no hazardous terrain nearby. It also shares use as a road.

See also

Transport in Bolivia
List of airports in Bolivia

References

External links 
OpenStreetMap - Ulla Ulla
OurAirports - Ulla Ulla
Fallingrain - Ulla Ulla Airport

Airports in La Paz Department (Bolivia)